Gush Etzion attacks may refer to:

2014 Alon Shvut stabbing attack, Gush Etzion
2014 kidnapping and murder of Israeli teenagers, Alon Shvut, Gush Etzion
2015 Gush Etzion Junction attack
2019 Gush Etzion ramming attack